Elwood Hope "Mike" Smith (November 16, 1904 in Norfolk, Virginia – May 31, 1981 in Chesapeake, Virginia) was an American outfielder, who played Major League Baseball in 1926 for the New York Giants. Smith attended the College of William & Mary. Smith played 4 major league games in his career, going 1-7 with 2 strikeouts.

External links 

1904 births
1981 deaths
Major League Baseball outfielders
New York Giants (NL) players
Baseball players from Norfolk, Virginia
William & Mary Tribe baseball players